Pestereva is a rural locality (a village) in Ust-Zulinskoye Rural Settlement, Yurlinsky District, Perm Krai, Russia. The population was 81 as of 2010. There are 3 streets.

Geography 
Pestereva is located 20 km northeast of Yurla (the district's administrative centre) by road. Demidova is the nearest rural locality.

References 

Rural localities in Yurlinsky District